Elisabeth "Liesl" Ellend (born 4 March 1940) is an Austrian former pair skater. Competing with Konrad Lienert, she became a two-time national champion (1957–1958). The pair finished fourth at the European Figure Skating Championships in 1955 and 1957, and ninth at the 1956 Winter Olympics.

Results

References

Austrian female pair skaters
Olympic figure skaters of Austria
Figure skaters at the 1956 Winter Olympics
1940 births
Living people